Sir Frederick Thomas Arthur Hervey-Bathurst, 4th Baronet (13 March 1833 – 20 May 1900) was an English cricketer. Hervey-Bathurst bowled fast roundarm and slow underarm. Hervey-Bathurst was also a Conservative politician.

Cricket career
Hervey-Bathurst made his first-class debut in 1852 for the Marylebone Cricket Club against Manchester Cricket Club. Hervey-Bathurst would represent the MCC in ten first-class matches up until 1861. In 1861 he played for Hampshire, this before the current county club was formed. Hervey-Bathurst represented them in a single match against his former team, the MCC. He then returned to play for the MCC for the last time against Sussex in the same year.

In 1865 Hervey-Bathurst represented Hampshire again, this time two years after the club's formation as a county club. Hervey-Bathurst played two matches for the county club, one in 1865 against Surrey and his final first-class match in 1866 against the club he first played first-class cricket for, the MCC.

Political career
Hervey-Bathurst was elected in the South Wiltshire by-election of 1861 as a Conservative Party Member of Parliament for South Wiltshire, a position he held until 1865, when he lost his seat to Liberal Politician Sir Thomas Grove in the 1865 election.

Later life
Following his father's death in 1881, he assumed the title of 4th Baronet. Hervey-Bathurst died in Westminster, London on 20 May 1900. Following his death, the title of Baronet passed to Frederick Edward William Hervey-Bathurst.

Family
Hervey-Bathurst was part of a cricketing family. He was the son of Sir Frederick Hervey-Bathurst, 3rd Baronet who represented both the MCC and the Hampshire team. His half-brother Lionel Hervey-Bathurst represented Hampshire in two first-class matches in 1875. His grandson Hervey Tudway played one first-class match for Somerset in 1910 and would go on to fight in the First World War where he was to be killed in action in 1914.

References

External links
Frederick Hervey-Bathurst at Cricinfo
Frederick Hervey-Bathurst at CricketArchive
Frederick Hervey-Bathurst

 

1833 births
1900 deaths
Cricketers from Greater London
English cricketers
Hampshire cricketers
Marylebone Cricket Club cricketers
Baronets in the Baronetage of the United Kingdom
UK MPs 1859–1865
Conservative Party (UK) MPs for English constituencies
English cricketers of 1826 to 1863
Presidents of the Marylebone Cricket Club
A to K v L to Z cricketers
Frederick Hervey